Adrián Hernán González (born 20 November 1976, in Avellaneda) is an Argentine footballer who last played for Club Atlético Platense. He is noted as a free kick specialist who can play as either a right back or right midfielder.

Career

González started his career at El Porvenir in the Regionalised 3rd Division of Argentine football in 1995.

In 1998 González joined San Lorenzo for the first time, during this spell with the club he helped the team to win the Clausura 2001 title.

After spells with Unión and Banfield González rejoined San Lorenzo in 2004.

In 2007 González helped San Lorenzo to win the Clausura tournament and was the club's captain for several seasons.

In 2009 González moved to Brazil to play for São Paulo FC.

Honours
San Lorenzo
Argentine Primera División (2): 2001 Clausura, 2007 Clausura
Arsenal
Argentine Primera División (1): 2012 Clausura

External links
 Argentine Primera statistics

1976 births
Living people
Sportspeople from Avellaneda
Argentine footballers
Argentine expatriate footballers
Association football midfielders
San Lorenzo de Almagro footballers
Club Atlético Banfield footballers
São Paulo FC players
Arsenal de Sarandí footballers
Unión de Santa Fe footballers
Club Atlético Platense footballers
Argentine Primera División players
Campeonato Brasileiro Série A players
Expatriate footballers in Brazil
Argentine expatriate sportspeople in Brazil